Maksim Konstantinovich Kaynov (born 24 March 2002) is a Russian football player who plays for FC Arsenal Tula.

Club career
He made his debut in the Russian Premier League for FC Arsenal Tula on 2 April 2022 in a game against FC Akhmat Grozny.

Personal life
He is a son of former footballer Konstantin Kaynov.

Career statistics

References

External links
 
 

2002 births
Sportspeople from Moscow Oblast
Living people
Russian footballers
Association football midfielders
FC Arsenal Tula players
Russian Premier League players
Russian First League players
Russian Second League players